Savage Sam is a 1962 children's novel written by Fred Gipson, his second book concerning the Coates family of frontier Texas in the late 1860s.  It is a sequel to 1956's Old Yeller. It was inspired by the story of former Apache captive Herman Lehmann, whom Gipson had seen give an exhibition when he was a child.  It was adapted into a motion picture of the same name.

Plot
Savage Sam is Old Yeller's son. He is a Bluetick Coonhound, and every bit as courageous and loyal as his father, as well as an incredibly keen tracker. Sam mostly likes chasing bobcats, sometimes with Arliss.
  
Travis and Arliss Coates and Lisbeth Searcy are taken captive by Apache and Comanche Indians. Jim Coates, the boys' father,  gathers up some neighboring men to go in search of them, which includes Lisbeth's somewhat overbearing grandfather, Bud Searcy. Travis manages to escape and is found by the search party (partly thanks to Sam's keen sense of smell), and they rescue Arliss and Lisbeth days later.

Novel series
A follow-up novella, Little Arliss, was discovered in Fred Gipson's papers by his son, and published in 1978.

References

1962 American novels
American children's novels
American novels adapted into films
Fictional dogs
Novels about dogs
Children's novels about animals
Harper & Row books
1962 children's books